Admiralty Bay is the name of several places:
Admiralty Bay, Bequia, in Bequia, Saint Vincent and the Grenadines
Admiralty Bay (New Zealand), in the Marlborough Sounds, South Island, New Zealand
Admiralty Bay (South Shetland Islands), Antarctica
Admiralty Bay (Washington), USA
Admiralty Bay is a former name of Ganges Harbour, British Columbia, Canada
Admiralty Bay is a former name of Yakutat Bay, Alaska, USA